Gangodawila Appuhamilage Sanjaya Kumara Gangodawila (born 20 June 1984) is a Sri Lankan cricketer who played for Bloomfield Cricket and Athletic Club, Kandurata cricket team and for the Basnahira cricket team in 53 First-class cricket matches, 52 List A cricket matches and 15 T20 cricket matches between 2006 and 2015.

He was bought by the Basnahira Cricket Dundee team in the 2012 Sri Lanka Premier League draft for the inaugural edition of the Sri Lankan Premier League in 2012. But he didn't feature in any of the matches as Basnahira Cricket Dundee failed to reach the semi-finals.

References

External links 
 

1984 births
Living people
Bloomfield Cricket and Athletic Club cricketers
Kandurata cricketers
Cricketers from Colombo
Basnahira cricketers